Euschizomerus is a genus of beetles in the family Carabidae, containing the following species:

 Euschizomerus aeneus Chaudoir, 1869 
 Euschizomerus buquetii Chaudoir, 1850
 Euschizomerus caerulans Andrewes, 1938
 Euschizomerus denticollis (Kollar, 1836) 
 Euschizomerus elongatus Chaudoir, 1861 
 Euschizomerus indicus Jedlicka, 1956 
 Euschizomerus junodi Peringuey, 1896 
 Euschizomerus liebkei Jedlicka, 1932
 Euschizomerus metallicus Harold, 1879 
 Euschizomerus nobilis Xie & Yu, 1991
 Euschizomerus oberthueri Fairmaire, 1898 
 Euschizomerus rufipes Heller, 1921 
 Euschizomerus schuhi Kirschenhofer, 2000 
 Euschizomerus vatovai G.Muller, 1941

References

Panagaeinae